Sergiy A. Vilkomir (November 19, 1956 – February 9, 2020) was a Ukrainian-born computer scientist.

Sergiy Vilkomir was born in 1956 in present-day Ukraine. He finished Mathematical College at the Moscow State University National Mathematical Boarding High School no. 18 (Head-Academician A. Kolmogorov, 1972–74), studied for an MSc degree in Mathematics and Mathematics Education at Kharkov State University (1974–79), and for a PhD degree at Kharkov Polytechnic Institute (1985–90). In Kharkiv, Ukraine, he then worked at the Ukrainian Polytechnic Institute (1979–82), the Central Institute of Complex Automation (1985–91), the Institute of Safety and Reliability of Technological Systems (1992–93), the Ukrainian State Scientific and Technical Centre on Nuclear and Radiation Safety (part of the Nuclear Safety Regulatory Authority of Ukraine, 1993–2000). His role included licensing and audits of computer-based safety systems at nuclear power plants.

In 2000, Vilkomir moved to the Centre for Applied Formal Methods at London South Bank University, becoming a Research Fellow there. He then joined the University of Wollongong in Australia, also as a Research Fellow. He subsequently worked with David Parnas at the University of Limerick in Ireland, before moving to the United States, initially as Research Associate Professor and the University of Tennessee during 2007–8, then rising to be an associate professor position at East Carolina University, which he joined in 2008. There he achieved academic tenure in 2012 and was Head of the Software Testing Research Group (STRG).

Vilkomir's main research contributions have been in the formalization of software testing. In particular, he proposed reinforced condition/decision coverage (RC/DC), a stronger version of the modified condition/decision coverage (MC/DC) coverage criterion for software testing in safety-critical systems.

Vilkomir was awarded the Google Faculty Research Award for 2010–11, the East Carolina University Scholar-Teacher Award in 2015, and the UNC Board of Governors Distinguished Professor of Teaching Award in 2017. He was a Senior Member of both the Association for Computing Machinery (ACM, from 2013), and the IEEE.

Sergiy Vilkomir died on February 9, 2020. He was married to Tetyana Vilkomir.

Selected publications

References

External links
 Sergiy Vilkomir home page
 Sergiy Vilkomir personal page
 Sergiy Vilkomir on ResearchGate
 Sergiy A. Vilkomir on DBLP
 

1956 births
2020 deaths
People from Kramatorsk
20th-century Ukrainian scientists
21st-century Ukrainian scientists
Moscow State University alumni
National University of Kharkiv alumni
Kharkiv Polytechnic Institute alumni
Ukrainian computer scientists
Ukrainian expatriates in the United States
American computer scientists
Formal methods people
Software engineering researchers
Academics of London South Bank University
Academic staff of the University of Wollongong
Academics of the University of Limerick
University of Tennessee faculty
East Carolina University faculty
Senior Members of the ACM
Senior Members of the IEEE